Halamphora is a genus of diatoms belonging to the family Amphipleuraceae.

The genus was first described by C. Mereschkowsky in 1903.

The genus has cosmopolitan distribution.

Species:
 Halamphora coffeaeformis
 Halamphora hybrida

References

Diatoms
Diatom genera